Burambi is a commune of Rumonge Province in southwestern Burundi. The capital of the commune is Burambi. It has a population of 57,167 people (last recorded in 2008).

References

Communes of Burundi
Rumonge Province